The title English footballer of the year can refer to the winner of either:

the Football Writers' Association Footballer of the Year
or,
the PFA Players' Player of the Year

zh:英格兰足球先生